Bibalan Rural District is a rural district (dehestan) in Kelachay District, Rudsar County, Gilan Province, Iran. At the 2006 census, its population was 12,073, in 3,437 families. The rural district has 30 villages.

References 

Rural Districts of Gilan Province
Rudsar County